Thomas Alan Berson (born 1946) is a cryptographer and computer security researcher. His notable work includes several cryptanalytic attacks, and research in the practical use of cryptographic protocols, particularly in computer networks.

A founding member of the International Association for Cryptologic Research, Tom Berson has been one of its officers since 1983, and was the first person selected as an IACR Fellow. He served as editor of the Journal of Cryptology from 1986 to 2001. At ASIACRYPT 2000 he delivered the IACR Distinguished Lecture, Cryptography Everywhere.

Berson was elected a member of the National Academy of Engineering in 2020 for contributions to cybersecurity in the commercial and intelligence communities. He serves on the advisory board of Salesforce.com.

References

External links
 Tom Berson's home page at Anagram Laboratories
 Tom Berson on LinkedIn 
 Bret Taylor, the likely successor to Marc Benioff, has quietly taken over important parts of Salesforce’s business — here’s who reports to whom at the highest levels of the company

1946 births
Living people
Modern cryptographers
Computer security academics
International Association for Cryptologic Research fellows